Shur Ab-e Vosta (also Romanized as Shūr Āb-e Vosţá; also known as Shūr Āb-e Vasaţ) is a village in Pol Khatun Rural District, Marzdaran District, Sarakhs County, Razavi Khorasan Province, Iran. At the 2006 census, its population was 57, in 14 families.

References 

Populated places in Sarakhs County